Pinus durangensis, the Durango pine, is a pine tree species endemic to the Sierra Madre Occidental mountain range of north-western Mexico.

This species is related to Pinus ponderosa (Ponderosa pine), and included in the same subsection Ponderosae.

Distribution
The tree is found from Chihuahua and Sonora, southwards through Durango and Jalisco, to Michoacán.

Description
The bark is thick, dark gray-brown, and scaly or fissured.

The leaves are needle-like, dark green, five to seven per fascicle (mostly six, this high number unique in the genus), 14–24 cm long and 0.7-1.1 mm wide, the persistent fascicle sheath 1.5–3 cm long.

The cones are ovoid, 5–9 cm long, green ripening brown, opening when mature in spring to 5–6 cm broad. The seeds are winged, 5–6 mm long with a 1.5-2.5 cm wing. Pollination is in late spring, with the cones maturing 20–22 months after.

References

 
 
 Farjon, A. & Styles, B. T. (1997). Pinus (Pinaceae). Flora Neotropica Monograph 75: 171-175.

Endemic flora of Mexico
Least concern plants
durangensis
Flora of the Sierra Madre Occidental
Trees of Chihuahua (state)
Trees of Durango
Trees of Jalisco
Trees of Michoacán
Trees of Sonora